Chlorophonia  is a genus of finches in the family Fringillidae.  The Chlorophonias are endemic to the Neotropics. They are small, mostly bright green birds that inhabit humid forests and nearby habitats, especially in highlands.

The genus Chlorophonia was erected in 1851 by the French ornithologist Charles Lucien Bonaparte. The name combines the Ancient Greek khlōros meaning "green" with the genus name Euphonia that had been introduced in 1806 by the French zoologist Anselme Gaëtan Desmarest. The type species was designated as the blue-naped chlorophonia (Chlorophonia cyaneaby) by the English zoologist George Robert Gray in 1855. The genus was once considered as a member of the tanager family, Thraupidae.

Species
The genus contains eight species:

References

 
Bird genera
Taxa named by Charles Lucien Bonaparte